Owli Rural District is in the Central District of Deyr County, Bushehr province, Iran. At the National Censuses of 2006 and 2011, its constituent villages were a part of Howmeh Rural District. At the most recent census of 2016, the population of the rural district was 1,960 in 406 households. The largest of its six villages was Owli-ye Shomali, with 1,269 people.

References 

Rural Districts of Bushehr Province
Populated places in Deyr County

fa:دهستان اولی